Yanco is a village with a population of 432 in Leeton Shire in south western New South Wales, Australia. Yanco is a Wiradjuri aboriginal language word meaning the sound of running water. Yanco is home to the Powerhouse Museum, McCaughey Park, Murrumbidgee Rural Studies Centre and Yanco Agricultural High School.

Yanco North Post Office opened on 1 March 1888. It was renamed Yanko in 1892 and Yanco in 1928.

Football 
The town has a team in the Group 20 Rugby League competition with neighbouring village Wamoon, the Yanco-Wamoon Hawks. They are renowned for winning five successive titles from 1992 to 1996, a competition record. The club briefly merged with rivals Narrandera from 2012 to 2014 as the Bidgee Hurricanes, but the sides demerged ahead of the 2015 season. They play at the Yanco Sports Ground, a picturesque oval located across the railway and irrigation channel from the town centre.

The town had a defunct Australian Rules Football team which played in the Farrer Football League along with Whitton, known as the Whitton-Yanco Tigers.

Heritage listings
Yanco has a number of heritage-listed sites, including:
 Yanco Weir
 259 Euroley Road: Yanco Agricultural High School

References

External links